Sava Radić (born 4 March 1998) is a Serbian footballer, who plays as a defender for FK Dubočica.

Club career

Čukarički
Born in Niš, Sava played for youth selections of Nacional Niš. He moved to Čukarički as a cadet in 2013. After two years spent with youth team, Radić signed his first three-year professional contract with club at the beginning of December 2015. He also continued playing with youth team and was a member of generation which won Serbian youth league and promotion in 2016–17 UEFA Youth League. Radić made his senior debut in the 6th fixture match of the 2016–17 Serbian SuperLiga campaign against Vojvodina, played on 21 August 2016, when he performed as a right-back. While with youth setup, Radić collected 6 games as a senior in both domestic competitions until the end of 2016–17 season. After overgrowing youth team, Radić has permanently joined first squad in summer 2017, when he converted his squad number, being assigned number 2 jersey. On 18 April 2018, Radić scored own goal in the first leg of the semifinal cup match against Partizan, after which he was replaced by Stefan Veličković in second half.

International career
Radić was a member of Serbia U16, U17 and U18 national football teams between 2013 and 2016. Radić was also called into Serbia U19 level for memorial tournament "Stevan Vilotić - Ćele" in August 2016. He played as a member of the selection until 2017.

Career statistics

Club

References

External links
 
 
 
 

1998 births
Living people
Sportspeople from Niš
Serbian footballers
Serbia youth international footballers
Association football defenders
FK Čukarički players
OFK Bečej 1918 players
OFK Bačka players
FK Dubočica players
Serbian SuperLiga players
Serbian First League players